In mathematics, the limit of a sequence of sets  (subsets of a common set ) is a set whose elements are determined by the sequence in either of two equivalent ways: (1) by upper and lower bounds on the sequence that converge monotonically to the same set (analogous to convergence of real-valued sequences) and (2) by convergence of a sequence of indicator functions which are themselves real-valued. As is the case with sequences of other objects, convergence is not necessary or even usual.

More generally, again analogous to real-valued sequences, the less restrictive limit infimum and limit supremum of a set sequence always exist and can be used to determine convergence: the limit exists if the limit infimum and limit supremum are identical. (See below). Such set limits are essential in measure theory and probability.

It is a common misconception that the limits infimum and supremum described here involve sets of accumulation points, that is, sets of  where each  is in some  This is only true if convergence is determined by the discrete metric (that is,  if there is  such that  for all ). This article is restricted to that situation as it is the only one relevant for measure theory and probability.  See the examples below. (On the other hand, there are more general topological notions of set convergence that do involve accumulation points under different metrics or topologies.)

Definitions

The two definitions
Suppose that  is a sequence of sets. The two equivalent definitions are as follows.

 Using union and intersection: define  and  If these two sets are equal, then the set-theoretic limit of the sequence  exists and is equal to that common set. Either set as described above can be used to get the limit, and there may be other means to get the limit as well.
 Using indicator functions: let  equal  if  and  otherwise. Define  and  where the expressions inside the brackets on the right are, respectively, the limit infimum and limit supremum of the real-valued sequence  Again, if these two sets are equal, then the set-theoretic limit of the sequence  exists and is equal to that common set, and either set as described above can be used to get the limit.

To see the equivalence of the definitions, consider the limit infimum. The use of De Morgan's law below explains why this suffices for the limit supremum. Since indicator functions take only values  and   if and only if  takes value  only finitely many times. Equivalently, 
 
Therefore,  is in the  if and only if  is in all but finitely many  For this reason, a shorthand phrase for the limit infimum is " is in  all but finitely often", typically expressed by writing " a.b.f.o.".

Similarly, an element  is in the limit supremum if, no matter how large  is, there exists  such that the element is in  That is,  is in the limit supremum if and only if  is in infinitely many  For this reason, a shorthand phrase for the limit supremum is " is in  infinitely often", typically expressed by writing " i.o.".

To put it another way, the limit infimum consists of elements that "eventually stay forever" (are in  set after  ), while the limit supremum consists of elements that "never leave forever" (are in  set after  ). Or more formally:
{|
|-
|-
|}

Monotone sequences

The sequence  is said to be nonincreasing if  for each  and nondecreasing if  for each  In each of these cases the set limit exists. Consider, for example, a nonincreasing sequence  Then 

From these it follows that

Similarly, if  is nondecreasing then 

The Cantor set is defined this way.

Properties
 It can be shown that the limit infimum is contained in the limit supremum:  for example, simply by observing that  all but finitely often implies  infinitely often.
 By using De Morgan's law twice, with set complement   That is,  all but finitely often is the same as  finitely often.
 From the second definition above and the definitions for limit infimum and limit supremum of a real-valued sequence,  and 
 Suppose  is a -algebra of subsets of  That is,  is nonempty and is closed under complement and under unions and intersections of countably many sets.

Examples
 Let  Then  and  So  exists.
 Change the previous example to  Then  and  So  does not exist, despite the fact that the left and right endpoints of the intervals converge to 0 and 1, respectively.
Therefore,  On the other hand,  which implies In this case, the sequence  does not have a limit. Note that  is not the set of accumulation points, which would be the entire interval  (according to the usual Euclidean metric).

Probability uses
Set limits, particularly the limit infimum and the limit supremum, are essential for probability and measure theory. Such limits are used to calculate (or prove) the probabilities and measures of other, more purposeful, sets. Sets in the σ-algebra are known as events.

If  is a monotone sequence of events in  then  exists and

Borel–Cantelli lemmas
In probability, the two Borel–Cantelli lemmas can be useful for showing that the limsup of a sequence of events has probability equal to 1 or to 0. The statement of the first (original) Borel–Cantelli lemma is

The second Borel–Cantelli lemma is a partial converse:

Almost sure convergence
One of the most important applications to probability is for demonstrating the almost sure convergence of a sequence of random variables. The event that a sequence of random variables  converges to another random variable  is formally expressed as  It would be a mistake, however, to write this simply as a limsup of events. That is, this  the event !

Therefore,

See also

References 

Set theory 
Probability theory